The Gaon Digital Chart, now known as the Circle Digital Chart, is a chart that ranks the best-performing singles in South Korea. Managed by the domestic Ministry of Culture, Sports and Tourism (MCST), its data is compiled by the Korea Music Content Industry Association and published by the Gaon Music Chart. The ranking is based collectively on each single's download sales, stream count, and background music use. In mid-2008, the Recording Industry Association of Korea ceased publishing music sales data. The MCST established a process to collect music sales in 2009, and began publishing its data with the introduction of the Gaon Music Chart the following February. With the creation of the Gaon Digital Chart, digital data for individual songs was provided in the country for the first time. Gaon provides weekly (listed from Sunday to Saturday), monthly, and yearly charts.

Twenty singles reached number one on the Digital Chart in 2021. "VVS" was the first song to top the ranking, doing so for two consecutive weeks. IU had four number-ones on the chart during the year—"Celebrity", "Lilac", "Nakka" (with AKMU), and "Strawberry Moon". "Celebrity" spent six consecutive weeks at number one and was the best-performing song of the year per Gaon's year-end report published in January 2022. "Rollin'" by Brave Girls became a sleeper hit, going viral in February and entering the chart in March for the first time in the four years since its release. It spent five non-consecutive weeks at number one, and ranked second on the year-end chart. "Stay" by Australian singer the Kid Laroi, and Canadian singer Justin Bieber, became the first song by an all non-South Korean act to top Gaon's weekly chart since its inception in 2010. "Celebrity", "Rollin'", "Butter" by BTS, "Foolish Love" by M.O.M, and "Stay" were the only songs to spend at least five weeks atop the chart.

On the monthly charts, IU had three number-one songs during the year: "Celebrity" topped the chart for February, "Lilac" for April, and "Strawberry Moon" for November. Brave Girls is the only artist to top the monthly chart twice with the same song: "Rollin'" was number one for March and May.

Weekly charts

Monthly charts

References

External links
  Current Gaon Digital Chart

2021 singles
Korea, South singles
2021 in South Korean music